Oleksandr Sizov (born 16 June 1988) is a Ukrainian basketball player for BC Dnipro and the Ukrainian national team, where he participated at the EuroBasket 2015.

References

1988 births
Living people
Ukrainian men's basketball players
Point guards
Sportspeople from Kharkiv
BC Dnipro players
BC Khimik players
MBC Mykolaiv players
BC Odesa players
BC Cherkaski Mavpy players